Sonia Point is a point lying 6 miles west of Rahir Point on the south side of Flandres Bay, on the northeast coast of Kyiv Peninsula, Graham Land. It is 1 mile north of Reade Peak.  First charted by the French Antarctic Expedition under Charcot, 1903–05, and named for Madame Sonia Bunau-Varilla.

References
 SCAR Composite Gazetteer of Antarctica.

Headlands of Graham Land
Danco Coast